Vasyl Tarasenko  (April 18, 1907 in Sosnytsia – 2001 in Kyiv) - he was Ukrainian diplomat. Doctor of History, Professor, Representative of the Ukrainian SSR in the United Nations Economic and Social Council, the United Nations Security Council.

Education 
Vasyl Tarasenko graduated from National Pedagogical Dragomanov University (1939)

Professional career and experience 
In 1939 - he was in teaching.
From 1941 to 1943 - he participated in World War II.
In 1943-1945 - he worked as Director of Zaporizhzhya Pedagogical Institute.
Since May 1945 - he was Assistant Minister of Foreign Affairs of the Ukrainian SSR.
From August 1945 to January 1946 - representative of the Ukrainian SSR of the European Committee for the Administration of relief and rehabilitation of the United Nations.
From January to November 1946 - Representative of the Ukrainian SSR in the Economic and Social Council of the United Nations.
In 1946-1948 - Advisor to the Soviet Embassy in the United States. He was a member delegations of Ukraine at the United Nations,
Since 1948 - Head of the Delegation of Ukraine at the United Nations.
In 1948-1949 - Representative of the Ukrainian SSR in the UN Security Council. He was Deputy Minister of Foreign Affairs of the Ukrainian SSR.
From 1950 to 1984 - was the Head of the Department of Modern History Taras Shevchenko National University of Kyiv. Professor.

Diplomatic rank 
 Ambassador Extraordinary and Plenipotentiary.

References

External links 
 Handbook of the history of the Communist Party and the Soviet Union 1898 - 1991
 As Ukrainian diplomat Israel created
 SCIENTIST AND DIPLOMAT
 Ukrainian accents to create the State of Israel

1907 births
2001 deaths
Permanent Representatives of Ukraine to the United Nations
20th-century Ukrainian historians
Ukrainian people of World War II
Burials at Baikove Cemetery